Ravish Malhotra (born 25 December 1943 in Lahore, British India) is a retired Air Commodore of the Indian Air Force. He was an Air Force test pilot stationed at the test centre in Bangalore. He was also the Air Officer Commanding of Hindon Air Force Station near Delhi.

In 1982, he was chosen to train for spaceflight in the Soviet Union's Intercosmos program. Malhotra served as backup for Rakesh Sharma on the Soyuz T-11 mission which launched the first Indian into space, but never went to space himself. Malhotra was awarded the Soviet Order of Friendship of Peoples in 1984 and the Kirti Chakra in 1985.

Early life 
Malhotra was born on 25 December 1943 in Lahore, in the Punjab Province of British India into a Punjabi Hindu family with three other siblings. His mother was Raj Malhotra and his father was SC Malhotra. His family moved from Lahore to Delhi after India's independence from Britain and the subsequent partition in 1947. The family first stayed at Malhotra's father's brother's house in Delhi before settling in Calcutta. Malhotra studied at St Thomas School in Calcutta. After graduation, he was admitted to the National Defence Academy (NDA). Speaking of his career choices, he would later say that he had wanted to join the Indian Navy but was instead drafted into the Indian Air Force (IAF). During the selections, he was told that his eyesight was not good enough for the navy and was selected for the Air Force, where there was a shortage of cadets at the time.

Career

Early career 
After graduating from the NDA, Malhotra was commissioned as an officer in 1963 to the Vampire Squadron of the Indian Air Force flying the De Havilland Vampire. During this period he was posted to the IAF base in Barrackpore near Calcutta. He progressively graduated to flying other aircraft including the F-111 Bomber, Dassault Mystère, HAL HF-24 Marut, and later the Soviet Sukhoi Su-22.

Malhotra was part of the IAF fighter squadron that was tasked with air raids over Pakistan in 1971, after that country had launched strikes on India prior to the Bangladesh (East Pakistan) liberation war. He flew the Sukhoi Su-22 making over 17 sorties into Pakistan air space, where some of his colleagues were captured and taken prisoners of war. In one attack in the Chamb-Jaurian sector in the then Western Pakistan, his plane was at the receiving end of heavy anti-aircraft gunfire, but he nevertheless returned to the air-base in India. The war ended with the successful liberation of Bangladesh.

Indo-Soviet Space Program 
After the war of 1971, Malhotra was selected for the U.S. Air Force Test Pilot School at the Edwards Air Force Base in California and later to the Indo-Soviet Space Program, a joint program between India and the former USSR. During this time, he would undertake tests at the Institute of Aerospace Medicine, in Bangalore and later in Moscow. The final tests would result in Malhotra, Rakesh Sharma, and two other cadets being selected to train for spaceflight in the Soviet Union's Intercosmos program in 1982.

Malhotra trained at the Yuri Gagarin Cosmonaut Training Center in Star City for over two years. The training and medium of instruction was in Russian since much of the instrumentation and other equipment markings were in Russian. In addition to physical conditioning in preparation for space flight, the cadets also worked on the simulators including sorties on the Ilyushin Il-76 aircraft which simulated near zero gravity and microgravity conditions for ~50 seconds at a time. Training also included sea recovery and survival since the Soyuz spacecraft capsule recovery was over the sea. During this time, his contact was limited to the cadets in the program, the Russian handlers, and officers from the Indian Embassy in Moscow, whom he met over the weekends. At the end of the training program, Malhotra and Sharma were shortlisted as the two members of the Indian team on the Soyuz T-11 mission to launch the first Indian into space in 1984. The two trained on multiple mission objectives including studying the effects of yoga in space as well as other biomedicine and remote sensing experiments. Malhotra remained Sharma's backup for this mission, while Sharma went on to be the first Indian in space. The decision to have Sharma go to space and Malhotra remain on the ground was taken by the Ministry of Defence in India halfway through the training program. Speaking later about the decision, Malhotra said, "I was disappointed, but you accept it, and move on with the mission". He remained on good terms with Sharma after the mission.

After returning from the Soviet Union, Malhotra was awarded the Soviet Order of Friendship of Peoples in 1984 and Kirti Chakra in 1985.

Later career 
Malhotra returned to his combat role in the Air Force upon his return to India and was posted as the commanding officer of the Hindan Air Force Station near the Indian capital of Delhi. He took an early retirement from the Air Force in 1995.

After his retirement from the Indian Air Force, Malhotra entered the private sector, setting up an aerospace manufacturing firm Dynamatic Aerospace. The NSE-listed company manufactures precision parts with clients including Boeing, Airbus, and Bell helicopters. He retired from the company at the age of 75.

Personal life 
Malhotra is married to Mira Malhotra, a psychologist. The couple have two children. As of 2021 he continues to live in Bangalore in Southern India.

References

External links 

 Air Commodore Ravish Malhotra: Service Record at Bharat Rakshak
 Soyuz T-10 Mission Report at Spacefacts.de

1943 births
Living people
Punjabi people
Indian Air Force officers
Indian astronauts
Military personnel from Lahore
Military personnel from Punjab, India
Recipients of the Order of Friendship of Peoples
Recipients of the Kirti Chakra
Punjabi Hindus